José Milton Melgar Soruco (born September 20, 1959) is a retired Bolivian football midfielder. In 2006, he was appointed by the Bolivian Government under President Evo Morales as Minister of Sports, but he resigned a year later. He currently runs his own youth football academy in his hometown.

Playing career

Club
At the club level, Melgar played for Blooming, Bolívar, Oriente Petrolero and Real Santa Cruz in Bolivia, as well as Everton (VdM) and Cobreloa in Chile.

He also played in Argentina for the two giants and fierce rivals Boca Juniors and River Plate.

In addition, during his career, he also had 53 Copa Libertadores appearances with 2 goals scored.

International
Melgar was capped 89 times and scored 6 international goals for Bolivia between 1980 and 1997. His tally of 89 caps was a national record until January 31, 2002, when it was broken by Marco Sandy who obtained his 90th cap in a friendly match against Brazil. Melgar played all three matches at the 1994 FIFA World Cup, and his club at that time was The Strongest.

Managerial career
Following his retirement, Melgar pursued a managerial career. In 2000, he made his official debut as manager with Oriente Petrolero. Later in the year he also managed Blooming. In October 2002 he assumed his duties as the U-17 and U-20 national teams, but his stint was unsuccessful.

Club titles

References

External links
 

1959 births
Living people
Sportspeople from Santa Cruz de la Sierra
Association football midfielders
Bolivian footballers
Bolivia international footballers
1994 FIFA World Cup players
1983 Copa América players
1987 Copa América players
1989 Copa América players
1991 Copa América players
1993 Copa América players
1995 Copa América players
1997 Copa América players
Club Blooming players
Boca Juniors footballers
Club Atlético River Plate footballers
Club Bolívar players
Oriente Petrolero players
Everton de Viña del Mar footballers
The Strongest players
Cobreloa footballers
Bolivian Primera División players
Argentine Primera División players
Bolivian expatriate footballers
Expatriate footballers in Argentina
Expatriate footballers in Chile
Bolivian expatriate sportspeople in Argentina
Bolivian expatriate sportspeople in Chile
Bolivian football managers
Oriente Petrolero managers
Club Blooming managers
Sports ministers of Bolivia